Gyeonggi region is the area of Seoul, Incheon, and Gyeonggi-do, a part of South Korea.

Gyeonggi region under North Korea's control 
Kaesong Special City, Changpung County in North Hwanghae Province, and southwestern part of Chorwon County belong to Gyeonggi region. Historically, these regions belonged to Gyeonggi-do. South Korea calls this area the Unrecovered Gyeonggi Province (미수복 경기도).

Regions of Korea